Isma'il Mexsut (April 1932 – 14 August 2017) was a Chinese politician of Uyghur origin who served as mayor of Ürümqi, the capital of Xinjiang, from 1983 to 1987. He was a member of the 8th and 9th National Committee of the Chinese People's Political Consultative Conference.

Biography
Isma'il Mexsut was born in Shufu County, Xinjiang, in April 1932, during the Republic of China.

He entered the workforce in February 1950, and joined the Communist Party of China (CPC) in August 1953. He was principal of the High School of Yecheng County in 1950 before getting involved in politics in Kashgar Prefecture in 1958. In 1973, he was assigned to Ürümqi, the capital of Xinjiang, and appointed deputy director and deputy party branch secretary of the Culture and Education Office and party branch secretary of the Education Bureau. In 1979, he took office as deputy head of the Organization Department of CPC Xinjiang Regional Committee, a position he held until 1983, when he was promoted to mayor of Ürümqi. In 1987, he was transferred to Xinjiang Production and Construction Corps and appointed deputy political commissar.

On 14 August 2017, Isma'il Mexsut died from an illness in Ürümqi, aged 85.

References

1932 births
2017 deaths
People from Shufu County
Uyghur politicians
Mayors of Ürümqi
People's Republic of China politicians from Xinjiang
Chinese Communist Party politicians from Xinjiang
Members of the 8th Chinese People's Political Consultative Conference
Members of the 9th Chinese People's Political Consultative Conference